Aoupinieta silacea is a species of moth of the family Tortricidae. It is found in New Caledonia in the south-west Pacific Ocean.

The wingspan is about 36 mm. The ground colour of the forewings is pale orange cream, densely strigulated (finely streaked) with brownish cream. The hindwings are cream.

Etymology
The species name refers to the colouration of the forewings and is derived from Latin silacea (meaning a yellowish pigment).

References

Moths described in 2013
Archipini
Taxa named by Józef Razowski